Paslepa is a village in Lääne-Nigula Parish, Lääne County, Western Estonia.

References
 

Villages in Lääne County
Kreis Wiek